Radio 1990 is a thirty-minute music video showcase program that ran during primetime on weekdays on USA Network. It was intended to compete directly with the major network program Friday Night Videos, as well as MTV and other cable channel shows like Night Tracks. It was a companion to another USA Network program, Night Flight, which featured a combination of music videos, interviews, standup comedy and other performances.

The program ran from March 1983 until September 1986, and was hosted by Lisa Robinson and Kathryn Kinley. It also featured celebrity musical guest co-hosts. In August 1985, Paul Stanley of KISS co-hosted for a week and Frank Zappa co-hosted during the week of Halloween 1985.

References

External links

1980s American music television series
USA Network original programming
Television series by Universal Television
1983 American television series debuts
1986 American television series endings